RapidCAD is a specially packaged Intel 486DX and a dummy floating point unit (FPU) designed as pin-compatible replacements for an Intel 80386 processor and 80387 FPU. Because the i486DX has a working on-chip FPU, a dummy FPU package is supplied to go in the Intel 387 FPU socket. The dummy FPU is used to provide the FERR signal, necessary for compatibility purposes.

Despite being able to execute instructions in the same number of cycles as an i486DX, integer performance on RapidCAD suffers due to the absence of level 1 cache and the bottleneck of the 386 bus. RapidCAD offers minimal improvement in integer performance over a 386DX (typically 10%, at most 35%), but provides substantial improvement in floating point operations (up to 80% faster) for which it was marketed. Floating point performance is mostly improved by moving the FPU onto the CPU core.

Technical specifications
Intel RapidCAD-1
Package: 132-Pin CPGA
CPU clock: 25/33 MHz
Transistors: 800,000 
Process: CHMOS 0.8 µm
Voltage: 5 V
sSpec: SZ624

Intel RapidCAD-2
Package: 68-Pin CPGA
CPU clock: 25/33 MHz
Transistors: 275,000
Process: CHMOS
Voltage: 5 V
sSpec: SZ625

See also
Intel 80486 OverDrive
Pentium OverDrive

External links
 CPU Shack - The CPU Museum: Intel RAPIDCAD
 pc-atrium - Intel RapidCAD Prozessoren

RapidCad